Lewis County Schools may refer to several school districts in the United States:

 Lewis County Schools (Kentucky)
 Lewis County Schools (West Virginia)